Henry Wildhagen (September 1, 1856 – March 23, 1920) was one of northern Wisconsin's best-known architects at the turn of the 20th century.

He was born in Hannover, Germany in 1856 and studied at the Technical University of Hannover. He immigrated to the US in 1886 and designed paper mills in the eastern U.S and Canada. He was married to Marie Wildhagen. In 1893 he came to Ashland and opened a design firm with civil engineer Herman Rettinghaus. There he designed many public buildings in northern Wisconsin.

A number of his works are listed on the U.S. National Register of Historic Places.

Works include:
Ashland County Courthouse, 201 West 2nd Street, Ashland, Wisconsin, designed by Henry Wildhagen and H. W. Buemming, noted for its Classical Revival and Beaux-Arts architecture, NRHP-listed
Ashland Middle School, Ashland
Beaser School, 612 Beaser Avenue, Ashland (Wildhagen, Henry), NRHP-listed
Ellis School, 310 Stuntz Avenue, Ashland (Wildhagen, Henry), NRHP-listed
William and Susanna Geenen House, 416 North Sidney Street, Kimberly, Wisconsin (Wildhagen, Henry), NRHP-listed
Mellen City Hall, corner of Bennett and Main Streets, Mellen, Wisconsin (Wildhagen & Reteauhaus), NRHP-listed
Phillips High School, 300 Cherry St. Phillips, Wisconsin, NRHP-listed
Royal Theatre, built 1914, 513 Main Street West, Ashland (Wildhagen, Henry)
Washburn Public Library, built 1904, Classical Revival, corner of Washington Avenue and West 3rd Street, Washburn, Wisconsin (Wildhagen, Henry), NRHP-listed
Wilmarth School, 913 3rd Avenue West, Ashland (Wildhagen, Henry), NRHP-listed

External links

References

1856 births
1920 deaths
Architects from Hanover
Architects from Wisconsin
German emigrants to the United States
People from Ashland, Wisconsin
University of Hanover alumni